Zelenchukskaya (Zelençuk) is a rural locality (a stanitsa) and the administrative center of Zelenchuksky District of the Karachay–Cherkess Republic, Russia, located on the Bolshoy Zelenchuk River. Population:  In terms of population, it is the most populous rural locality in the republic.

The Special Astrophysical Observatory of the Russian Academy of Science is located to the south of the stanitsa. In 2015, it detected signals that might have come from a possible advanced extraterrestrial civilization, which are now being investigated by SETI.

History
The stanitsa was founded on May 1, 1859 and named after the river on which it stands.

Demographics
In 2002, the population included:
Russians (77.1%)
Karachays (17.4%)
all other ethnicities comprising less than 1% of population each

Climate
Zelenchukskaya has a warm-summer humid continental climate (Köppen climate classification: Dfb) with moderately warm and very humid summers and cold, dry winters.

References

Notes

Sources

Rural localities in Karachay-Cherkessia
Kuban Oblast